John Tilden Locke (September 25, 1943 – August 4, 2006) was an American keyboardist and a member of the rock group Spirit. In the early 1980s, he was a member of the band Nazareth.

Biography 
Locke was born in Los Angeles, California. His father was a classical violinist and his mother sang operas and was a composer. In 1967 he formed the Red Roosters with the guitarist Randy California. A year later they had changed the name to Spirit and signed a deal with Ode Records for four albums. He remained involved with the band during most of his career.

Besides Spirit, he performed on the Tom Rush album Wrong End of the Rainbow. In the period 1980–1982 he performed with the Scottish band Nazareth and appeared on three albums: The Fool Circle, 'Snaz, and 2XS. He also played keyboards on the Stray Cats album Gonna Ball, and on Randy California's solo albums Euro-American and Restless.

Death 
Locke died in Ojai, California, at the age of 62.

References

External links 
 
 
 

1943 births
2006 deaths
American rock keyboardists
Musicians from Los Angeles
Spirit (band) members
Nazareth (band) members
20th-century American keyboardists

Deaths from cancer in California